Smithville is a city in Bastrop County, Texas, United States, near the Colorado River. The population was 3,922 at the 2020 census.

History

Thomas Jefferson Gazley arrived in 1827 and set the pace of development for Smithville by building the first house and establishing the first store, which served incoming settlers. He later served in the Mexican government and helped write the Texas Declaration of Independence and the first Constitution, and became a true Texas hero.

William Smith's family arrived several years after Gazley. They also owned a store and were early influences on the area, including the naming of Smithville where about seventeen families lived on the south bank of the Colorado River.

Local businessman, Murray Burleson, persuaded the approaching railroad to erect a terminus here and the TB&H steamed through in 1887. The Missouri, Kansas & Texas took over the Taylor, Bastrop, and Houston Railroad in 1891. In 1894, the MK&T established central shops in Smithville, giving rise to growth which resulted in Smithville becoming the largest town in Bastrop County for nearly fifty years.

This population created markets for homes, stores, and other necessities as it grew from a frontier village to a town. The Hill family moved retail marketing here and established the first bank. The need for infrastructure systems attracted the Buescher brothers to come and create the first utilities. Partnerships of prominent men involved in land-based activities united the Bueschers, Powells, Cooks, Eaglestons, Turneys, Rabbs, Buntes and others to establish cotton gins, general stores, drugstores, lumber and brickyards and to develop numerous churches and fraternal organizations such as the Masons and the Oddfellows and to provide medical care for this now flourishing community.

In 1895, this thriving town was officially incorporated into the City of Smithville.

Geography
Smithville is located in southeastern Bastrop County.

Highways

Demographics

As of the 2020 United States census, there were 3,922 people, 1,711 households, and 1,088 families residing in the city.

As of the census of 2000, there were 3,901 people, 1,491 households, and 990 families residing in the city.  The population density was 1,112.7 people per square mile (429.1/km2). There were 1,672 housing units at an average density of 476.9 per square mile (183.9/km2).  The racial makeup of the city was 78.01% White, 14.53% African American, 0.31% Native American, 0.41% Asian, 5.10% from other races, and 1.64% from two or more races.  Hispanic or Latino of any race were 15.43% of the population.

There were 1,491 households, out of which 31.0% had children under the age of 18 living with them, 49.0% were married couples living together, 13.8% had a female householder with no husband present, and 33.6% were non-families. 28.6% of all households were made up of individuals, and 14.6% had someone living alone who was 65 years of age or older. The average household size was 2.53 and the average family size was 3.15.

In the city, the population was spread out, with 27.2% under the age of 18, 7.3% from 18 to 24, 27.3% from 25 to 44, 19.3% from 45 to 64, and 18.9% who were 65 years of age or older. The median age was 37 years.  For every 100 females, there were 88.3 males.  For every 100 females age 18 and over, there were 82.9 males.

The median income for a household in the city was $35,586, and the median income for a family was $45,163.  Males had a median income of $33,500 versus $23,409 for females.  The per capita income for the city was $16,282. About 12.1% of families and 15.9% of the population were below the poverty line, including 21.2% of those under age 18 and 17.9% of those age 65 or over.

Government

Education

Smithville is served by the Smithville Independent School District and home to the Smithville High School Tigers.

Austin Community College, which has an attendance area covering most school districts in Bastrop County, has a campus in nearby Elgin, and Austin,  to the west, boasts multiple major universities.

Points of interest
 The Smithville Visitor Center, James H. Long Railroad Museum & Chamber of Commerce, located at 100 Main Street in Smithville, contains exhibits and relics from Smithville's railroad history.

 The Smithville post office contains an oil on canvas mural, The Law, Texas Rangers, painted in 1939 by Minette Teichmueller. Murals were produced from 1934 to 1943 in the United States through the Section of Painting and Sculpture, later called the Section of Fine Arts, of the Treasury Department. The WPA was the largest and most ambitious American New Deal agency, employing individuals to carry out public works projects.

Public murals were installed in Smithville in 2018 and 2019 depicting scenes from important Smithville events and murals of local leaders.

Notable people
 Bettye Caldwell, educator
 Thomas Carter, actor and Emmy Award-winning director
 Hannibal Lokumbe (also known as "Hannibal"), jazz trumpeter and composer
 Balor Moore, major league baseball pitcher born in Smithville
 Sonny Rhodes, blues singer and lap steel guitar player
 DJ Screw (Robert Earl Davis, Jr.), hip hop artist; born in Smithville and later moved to Houston

Climate

In Film

Smithville has its own film commission managed by the Smithville Area Chamber of Commerce and continues to promote itself as a Film Friendly Community, a designation it received from the Texas Film Commission in 2008. Following is a list of some productions that had filming locations in Smithville.
 Hope Floats starring Sandra Bullock and Harry Connick, Jr. was set and filmed in Smithville, and was released at theaters across the nation on May 29, 1998.
 The Tree of Life starring Brad Pitt, Sean Penn and Jessica Chastain was filmed in Smithville, and was released in May 2011. The film, which was directed by Terrence Malick, won the Palme d'Or at the Cannes Film Festival in 2011. This film was nominated for three Oscars, including Best Cinematography, Best Director, and Best Picture at the 2012 Academy Awards ceremony.
 The film Natural Selection starring Rachael Harris was filmed in Smithville and released in 2011.
 The film Doonby starring John Schneider was filmed in Smithville in 2010, and was released in 2011.
 The Richard Linklater-directed film Bernie was filmed in Smithville. Released in 2011, the movie stars Jack Black, Shirley MacLaine and Matthew McConaughey.
 The horror-thriller film Beneath the Darkness starring Dennis Quaid, Tony Oller and Aimee Teegarden was released in 2012. 
 Smithville has also been the location for several commercials, notably Valero Energy Corporation and Dairy Queen.
Ranch Water, an indie feature film was filmed in Smithville in Fall 2020 and made its World Premiere at The 2021 Austin Film Festival.
 The teen drama show “Panic” was shot throughout the town of Smithville.

Guinness World Records

On December 2, 2006, at the city's 16th Annual Festival of Lights, Smithville broke the Guinness World Record for the world's largest gingerbread man. Some of the ingredients used were 750 pounds of flour, 49 gallons of molasses and 72 dozen eggs. The pan used in the baking now stands as a monument at the James H. Long Railroad Park in Smithville. The record has since been broken by a Norwegian IKEA display.

References

External links

 City of Smithville official website
Smithville Area Chamber of Commerce
 

Cities in Bastrop County, Texas
Cities in Texas
Cities in Greater Austin
Populated places established in 1827
1827 establishments in Texas